Bobbi Lee Maracle  (born Marguerite Aline Carter; July 2, 1950November 11, 2021) was an Indigenous Canadian writer and academic of the Stó꞉lō nation. Born in North Vancouver, British Columbia, she left formal education after grade 8 to travel across North America, attending Simon Fraser University on her return to Canada. Her first book, an autobiography called Bobbi Lee: Indian Rebel, was published in 1975. She wrote fiction, non-fiction, and criticism and held various academic positions. Maracle's work focused on the lives of Indigenous people, particularly women, in contemporary North America.

Early life and education
The granddaughter of Tsleil-Waututh Chief Dan George, Marguerite Aline Carter was born on July 2, 1950, in North Vancouver, British Columbia. "Lee" was a nickname for "Aline". She grew up in North Vancouver, raised mainly by her mother, Jean (Croutze) Carter.  

Maracle dropped out of school after grade 8 and went from California, where she did various jobs that included producing films and doing stand-up comedy, to Toronto. After returning to Canada, she attended Simon Fraser University. In the 1970s, she became involved with the Red Power movement in Vancouver.

Writing
Maracle's writing explores the experience of Indigenous women, critiquing patriarchy and white supremacy. Her first book was an autobiography: Bobbi Lee: Indian Rebel, published in 1975. The book began as an assignment in a course about writing life histories. Critic Harmut Lutz describes Indian Rebel as "a celebration of Native survival", comparing it to the works of Maria Campbell and Howard Adams. Indian Rebel was "one of the first Indigenous works published in Canada".

I Am Woman (1988) applies feminist theory to the situation of Indigenous women, describing women's sexual victimization at the hands of Indigenous and white men alike. Sojourner's Truth (1990), a collection of short stories, describes the everyday lives of Indigenous people dealing with a "Eurocentric culture". Her poetry book, Hope Matters, was written in conjunction with her daughters Columpa Bobb and Tania Carter, and was published in 2019.

Academic positions 
Maracle was one of the founders of the En'owkin International School of Writing in Penticton, British Columbia. She was the cultural director of the Centre for Indigenous Theatre in Toronto, Ontario, from 1998 to 2000.

Maracle taught at the University of Toronto, University of Waterloo, and Southern Oregon University, and was a professor of Canadian culture at Western Washington University. She lived in Toronto, teaching at the University of Toronto First Nations House. She was the writer-in-residence at the University of Guelph.

Personal life 
Maracle belonged to the Stó꞉lō nation and had Salish and Cree ancestry. She has been described as Métis. She was married to Raymond Bobb and later to Aiyyana Maracle. She and Raymond had two daughters, including Columpa Bobb, and one son, actor Sid Bobb.

She died on November 11, 2021, at Surrey Memorial Hospital in Surrey, British Columbia.

Awards and honours 
Maracle was named an officer of the Order of Canada in 2018. In 2017, Maracle was presented with the Bonham Centre Award from the Mark S. Bonham Centre for Sexual Diversity Studies, University of Toronto, for her contributions to the advancement and education of issues around sexual identification. She delivered the 2021 Margaret Laurence Lecture on "A Writing Life". In 2020, she was named finalist for the Neustadt International Prize for "Celia's Song".

Publications

Fiction
 Sojourner's Truth and Other Stories (1990)
 Sundogs – 1992
 Ravensong – (Press Gang Publishers, 1993)
 Daughters Are Forever (2002)
 Will's Garden (2002)
 First Wives Club: Coast Salish Style (Theytus Books Publishing, 2010)

Non-fiction
 Bobbi Lee: Indian Rebel (1975, reissued 1990)
 I Am Woman: A Native Perspective on Sociology and Feminism (1988; Press Gang Publishers, 1996)
 Oratory: Coming to Theory (1990)
 My Conversations with Canadians (2017)

Poetry
 Bent Box (2000)
Talking to the Diaspora (2015) ISBN 9781894037655
  (with Columpa Bobb and Tania Carter)

Collaborations
 My Home as I Remember (2000)
 We Get Our Living Like Milk from the Land (1993)
 Telling It: Women and Language Across Cultures (with Betsy Warland, Sky Lee and Daphne Marlatt) (Press Gang Publishers, 1990)

See also
 List of University of Waterloo people

Citations

General sources

Further reading 
 
 
 
 
 

1950 births
2021 deaths
Writers from Vancouver
Canadian women poets
Canadian women novelists
First Nations feminists
Simon Fraser University alumni
Southern Oregon University faculty
Western Washington University faculty
Academic staff of the University of Toronto
Academic staff of the University of Waterloo
First Nations women writers
20th-century Canadian novelists
21st-century Canadian novelists
20th-century Canadian poets
21st-century Canadian poets
20th-century Canadian women writers
21st-century Canadian women writers
First Nations poets
First Nations novelists
Canadian feminist writers
Officers of the Order of Canada
20th-century First Nations writers
21st-century First Nations writers
Canadian indigenous women academics
First Nations academics